San Juan Airport  is a public use airport located near San Juan, Beni, Bolivia.

See also

Transport in Bolivia
List of airports in Bolivia

References

External links 
 Airport record for San Juan Airport at Landings.com

Airports in Beni Department